Andia Chaves Fonnegra is a Colombian marine biologist known for her research on the marine sponge Cliona delitrix.

Education and career
Chaves earned her bachelor's degree (2001) and her master's degree (2006) in marine biology from the National University of Colombia. In 2007 she taught at Colombia's Universidad Pedagogic Nacional before moving to the University of Alberta where she worked from 2007 to 2008. In 2009 she moved to Florida and became a graduate student at Nova Southeastern University, where she graduated in 2014 with a PhD in oceanography and marine biology. Fonnegra's dissertation was "Increase of Excavating Sponges on Caribbean Coral Reefs: Reproduction, Dispersal, and Coral Deterioration".

In 2018, Chavez became an assistant professor at Florida Atlantic University, where she works at the Harbor Branch Oceanographic Institute. She is known for her research on the marine sponge Cliona delitrix, an organism that grows between the calcium carbonate that forms the skeleton of coral reefs and that, through an excavating action, gradually deteriorates the coral. In the Caribbean Sea the development of this sponge has accelerated in recent years, resulting in the gradual erosion of corals, altering the ecosystem.

Awards and honors
 2002 - SIGMA XI Grant Award, Scientific Research Society
 2006 - Meritorious Mention Master's Thesis, Universidad Nacional de Colombia
 2008 - Donald Ross Academic Merit, University of Alberta
 2011 - L'Oréal-UNESCO Scholarship for Women in Science
 2014 - Student Life Achievement Award, Nova Southeastern University
2019 - Gulf Research Program’s Early-Career Research Fellowships of The National Academies of Sciences, Engineering and Medicine.

Selected publications

References

External links
 

Living people
Colombian women biologists
Colombian marine biologists
National University of Colombia alumni
Nova Southeastern University alumni
Academic staff of the National Pedagogic University (Colombia)
Florida Atlantic University faculty
Year of birth missing (living people)